Sir Richard Warwick Bampfylde, 4th Baronet (21 November 1722 – 15 July 1776) of Poltimore, North Molton, Warleigh, Tamerton Foliot and Copplestone in Devon and of  Hardington in Somerset, England, was  Member of Parliament for Exeter (1743–47) and for Devonshire (1747–76).

Origins

He was the only son and heir of Sir Coplestone Bampfylde, 3rd Baronet of Poltimore, North Molton and Warleigh in Devon and of Hardington in Somerset, by his wife Gertrude Carew, daughter of Sir John Carew, 3rd Baronet, of Antony in Cornwall. He was baptised in Poltimore in Devon.

Career
In 1727, aged only five, he succeeded his father as 4th baronet. He was educated at New College, Oxford and graduated as Master of Arts in 1741.

He was Member of Parliament for Exeter from 1743 to 1747 and subsequently for Devonshire from 1747 until his death in 1776. He was Lieutenant-Colonel of the East Devon Militia from its formation in 1758 until he resigned in 1771.

Marriage and progeny
On 8 August 1742 in the chapel of Somerset House, London, he married Jane Codrington (d.1789), daughter and heiress of Colonel John Codrington of Charlton House, Wraxall, Somerset, by whom he had six sons and seven daughters including: 
 Charles Warwick Bampfylde (1751–1751), eldest son who died an infant, buried at Poltimore.
 Sir Charles Bampfylde, 5th Baronet (1753–1823), MP, 2nd and eldest surviving son and heir.
 John Codrington Bampfylde (1754–1797), 3rd son, the poet.
 Amias Warwick Bampfylde (1757–1834), 4th son.
 Richard Warwick Bampfylde (1769–1834), 5th son, appointed by his father Rector of Poltimore also Rector of Black Torrington, Devon.
 Charlotte Bampfylde (born 1750), 5th daughter, wife of Abel Moysey (1743–1831) of Hinton Charterhouse, Somerset, MP for Bath (1774–1790).
 Harriet, who married George Daniell, a physician, and was grandmother to George Daniell (medical doctor)

Landholdings
In 1741 his seats were Copplestone and Poltimore in Devon and Hardington in Somerset. His townhouse in Exeter was Bampfield House, demolished in World War II.

Death, burial & succession
Bampfylde died on 15 July 1776 and was buried at Poltimore. He was succeeded in the baronetcy by his eldest surviving son Sir Charles Bampfylde, 5th Baronet (1753–1823).

References

Further reading
 History of Parliament biography of Bampfylde, Sir Richard Warwick, 4th Bt. (1722–76), of Poltimore, Devon

1722 births
1776 deaths
Alumni of New College, Oxford
Baronets in the Baronetage of England
British MPs 1741–1747
British MPs 1747–1754
British MPs 1754–1761
British MPs 1761–1768
British MPs 1768–1774
British MPs 1774–1780
Members of the Parliament of Great Britain for Exeter
Members of the Parliament of Great Britain for Devon
Devon Militia officers